Cham may refer to:
Cham, Hamadan
Cham, Isfahan
Cham, Falavarjan, Isfahan Province
Cham, Nain, Isfahan Province
Cham, Behbahan, Khuzestan Province
Cham, Izeh, Khuzestan Province
Cham, Ramshir, Khuzestan Province
Cham, Yazd

See also
Cham is a common element in Iranian place names; see